Brownlow Integrated College, Tullygally Road, Craigavon, County Armagh, Northern Ireland was founded in 1973 as Brownlow High School. In 1991, it became the first secondary school in Northern Ireland to transition from a state-controlled school to an integrated school. Mrs N Stevenson is the school's current principal.

Brownlow has about 320 pupils. It is not part of the Craigavon two-tier system. The year 8 intake in 2018 was 64.

Context
Integrated Education is a Northern Ireland phenomenon, where traditionally schools were sectarian, either run as Catholic schools or Protestant schools. On as parental request, a school could apply to 'transition' to become Grant Maintained offering 30% of the school places to students from the minority community. Lagan College was the first integrated school to open in 1981.

See also
 List of integrated schools in Northern Ireland
 List of secondary schools in Northern Ireland

 Education in Northern Ireland

References

External links
Brownlow Integrated College Website
 NICIE website

Integrated schools in County Armagh
Secondary schools in County Armagh